John Choi Young-su (March 2, 1942 – August 31, 2009) was the South Korean Archbishop of the Roman Catholic Archdiocese of Daegu from 2007 to 2009.

Young-su was ordained a Catholic priest on November 6, 1970, and was elevated to Auxiliary bishop of the Roman Catholic Archdiocese of Daegu in 2000. He was further appointed the Coadjutor Archbishop of Daegu on February 3, 2006.

Young-su became Archbishop of the Archdiocese of Daegu on March 29, 2007, succeeding Paul Ri Moun-hi. He remained Archbishop until his resignation on August 17, 2009, due to health concerns. Young-su died on August 31 at the age of 67.

References

External links
Catholic Hierarchy: Archbishop John Choi Young-su †

1942 births
2009 deaths
South Korean Roman Catholic archbishops
Kyeongbuk High School alumni
21st-century Roman Catholic archbishops in South Korea
21st-century Roman Catholic bishops in South Korea
Roman Catholic archbishops of Daegu